Allan Davidson may refer to:

 Scotty Davidson (Allan McLean Davidson, 1891–1915), Canadian ice hockey player and soldier
 Allan Douglas Davidson (1873–1932), English painter
 Allan A. Davidson, lawyer and political figure in New Brunswick, Canada

See also
Alan Davidson (disambiguation)